Rushey Green is an electoral ward in the London Borough of Lewisham. The ward covers most of central, northern and western Catford. The population of the ward at the 2011 Census was 14,916.

References

External links
Rushey Green ward councillors

Wards of the London Borough of Lewisham